JAMA Oncology is a monthly peer-reviewed medical journal published by the American Medical Association. It covers all aspects of medical oncology, radiation oncology, and surgical oncology, as well as subspecialties. The journal was established in 2015. The founding editor-in-chief is Mary L. Disis.

Abstracting and indexing
The journal is abstracted and indexed in Index Medicus/MEDLINE/PubMed. According to Journal Citation Reports, the journal's 2021 impact factor is 33.006, ranking it 10th out of 246 titles in the category "Oncology".

See also
List of American Medical Association journals

References

External links

Oncology journals
Publications established in 2015
Monthly journals
English-language journals
American Medical Association academic journals